Stenoma latitans is a moth in the family Depressariidae. It was described by Paul Dognin in 1905. It is found in São Paulo, Brazil.

References

Moths described in 1905
Stenoma